Gord may refer to

Gord (archaeology), medieval Slavic settlement
 Gord (given name), people and characters with the given name
 Gastro-oesophageal reflux disease (GORD), a stomach disorder
 Ken Gord (born 1949), Canadian film and television producer

See also
Gordian Knot
Gordon
Gordy (disambiguation)
Gourd